Croswell-Lexington High School, commonly abbreviated to simply "Cros-Lex", is a public secondary school in Croswell, Michigan.

References

External links

Educational institutions established in 1967
Public high schools in Michigan
Schools in Sanilac County, Michigan
1967 establishments in Michigan